Bourbon Coffee is a coffeehouse chain based in Kigali, Rwanda. It has currently 8 coffeehouses in Kigali, the first one at Union Trade Centre (UTC) in Kiyovu, the second one at the MTN centre in Nyarutarama, the third in Kigali City Tower, the fourth one at Kigali International Airport.

It is also expanding to the United States market, opening locations simultaneously in Boston and in Washington, D.C. at 2101 L St NW.

See also 
 List of coffeehouse chains

References

External links 
 Website

Coffeehouses and cafés
Organisations based in Kigali
Economy of Kigali
Companies of Rwanda
Year of establishment missing
2007 establishments in Rwanda